Brady Grey (born 20 July 1995) is an Australian rules footballer who played for the Fremantle Football Club in the Australian Football League (AFL).

Drafted with the 58th selection in the 2013 AFL draft from the Burnie Dockers Football Club in the Tasmanian State League, he played for Peel Thunder in the West Australian Football League (WAFL), Fremantle's reserve team during the 2014 season before suffering a stress fracture in his back in July.

Grey continued to play for Peel throughout 2015, and made his AFL debut for Fremantle in the final round of the 2015 AFL season, when Fremantle sent a weakened team to play Port Adelaide at Adelaide Oval.  Twelve changes were made to the team, and Grey was one of four players to make their AFL debuts. He was delisted at the conclusion of the 2016 season, before he was subsequently re-drafted by Fremantle in the 2017 rookie draft. He played 14 games for Fremantle in 2017, but only four more in 2018 before being delisted again at the end of the season.

In 2019, Grey joined the West Coast Eagles's reserves team in the WAFL. However, when the team withdrew from the league in 2020 due to the COVID-19 restrictions, Grey switched to play for Perth.

References

External links

WAFL Player Profile and Statistics

1995 births
Living people
Fremantle Football Club players
Peel Thunder Football Club players
Australian rules footballers from Tasmania
Indigenous Australian players of Australian rules football
Burnie Dockers Football Club players
West Coast Eagles (WAFL) players
Perth Football Club players
Box Hill Football Club players